Almog Cohen is an Israeli politician, former police officer, and regional coordinator of Otzma Yehudit. He is the leader of the Negev Rescue Committee, which planned to establish the "Barel Rangers", a civilian armed militia force in the Negev, in which nearly 200 recruits had been enlisted. However, in response to public backlash, the police withdrew their endorsement of its registration for the status of "police volunteers", causing the Be'er Sheva municipality to order the cession of the establishment of the militia.

He was placed as the seventh mandate under a merger deal between Otzma Yehudit, and the Religious Zionist Party, ahead of the 2022 Israeli legislative elections. He became an MK after the election.

In January 2023, Twitter suspended Cohen's account following a tweet in which he expressed support for the actions of the Israeli Defense Forces during a raid in Jenin that resulted in the deaths of nine Palestinians. Cohen's tweet read, "Good and professional work by the fighters in Jenin, keep killing them." He criticized Twitter's decision, calling it "the worst kind of censorship" and defended his statement, claiming that his intention was clearly to target "terrorists involved and not bystanders".

References 

1987 births
Living people
Members of the 25th Knesset (2022–)
Otzma Yehudit politicians